This page shows the main events during the 1998 year in the sport of athletics throughout the world.

Major Events

World

 Commonwealth Games
 Goodwill Games
 Grand Prix Final
 IAAF World Combined Events Challenge
 World Cross Country Championships
 World Cup
 World Half Marathon Championships
 World Junior Championships

Regional

 African Championships
 Asian Championships
 Asian Games
 Balkan Games
 CARIFTA Games
 Central American and Caribbean Games
 Central American and Caribbean Junior Championships
 European Championships
 European Cross Country Championships
 European Indoor Championships
 Ibero-American Championships
 South American Junior Championships
 South American Youth Championships

World records

Men

Women

Awards

Men

Women

Men's Best Year Performances

400m Hurdles

3,000m Steeplechase

Pole Vault

Hammer Throw

Decathlon

Women's Best Year Performances

60 metres

100 metres

200 metres

Half Marathon

60m Hurdles

100m Hurdles

400m Hurdles

3,000m Steeplechase

High Jump

Shot Put

Pole Vault

Hammer Throw

Heptathlon

Marathon

Men's Best Year Performances

Women's Best Year Performances

Deaths
April 6 — Ed Ablowich (84), American sprinter (b. 1913)
August 17 — Władysław Komar (58), Polish shot putter (b. 1940)
September 16 — John Systad (86), Norwegian long-distance runner (b. 1912)
December 2 — Mikio Oda (93), Japanese athlete (b. 1905)

References
 ARRS

 
Athletics (track and field) by year